No. 114 Helicopter Unit (Siachen Pioneers) is a Helicopter Unit and is equipped with HAL Cheetah and based at Leh Air Force Station.

History
The unit was formed with an establishment of 10 Chetak (Then Alloutte III) helicopters. This unit had the distinction of being the first All-Chetak unit raised in the IAF.

President's standard has been bestowed upon this Unit in recognition of exceptional service rendered to the nation on 13 Nov 1996.

Assignments
Indo-Pakistani War of 1965

Aircraft
HAL Cheetal
HAL Cheetah

References

114